Shady Grove Baptist Church is a historic church at 3444 31st Way North, Collegeville in Birmingham, Alabama. The building is of concrete construction that was built in 1942 under the direct of its pastor, the Rev. Lewis J. Rogers. The exterior was faced with Permastone in the early 1960s. It is significant for its congregation's participation in the Alabama Christian Movement for Human Rights rallies for Civil rights in the 1950s and the 1960s under Rogers' direction. The building was added to the National Register of Historic Places in 2005.

References

Baptist churches in Alabama
Churches on the National Register of Historic Places in Alabama
National Register of Historic Places in Birmingham, Alabama
Churches completed in 1958
Churches in Birmingham, Alabama